Bonanza Peak is a 6,983-foot (2,128 meter) mountain summit located in the Wrangell Mountains, in the U.S. state of Alaska. The peak was notable for its abundance of copper deposits which were mined from 1909 through 1938. The confluence of the Kennicott and Root Glaciers lies below the mountain's west slope. Precipitation runoff from the mountain drains into tributaries of the Nizina River, which in turn is part of the Copper River drainage basin. The mountain's local name was reported in 1914 by the U.S. Geological Survey. On a clear day the summit of Bonanza Peak offers views of Sourdough Peak, Mount Blackburn, and Fireweed Mountain.

History

Bonanza Peak hosted five mines: Bonanza, Jumbo, Mother Lode, Erie, and Glacier. The Bonanza ore body was discovered August 1900 by prospectors "Tarantula" Jack Smith and Clarence L. Warner. Bonanza Mine was located on a ridge south of the summit, and was in the early 1900s, confirmed by Stephen Birch as the richest known concentration of copper in the world. Glacier Mine, which is really an ore extension of the Bonanza, was an open-pit mine and was only mined during the summer. Jumbo Mine was in the west cirque below the summit. The Mother Lode mine was located in a cirque on the east side of the summit. The Erie mine was perched on the northwest slope above the Root Glacier. The Bonanza, Jumbo, Mother Lode and Erie mines were connected by tunnels. From 1909 until 1938, the mines produced over 4.6 million tons of ore containing 1.183 billion pounds of copper mainly from the Bonanza, Jumbo and Mother Lode, as well as several million ounces of silver. The Kennecott operations reported gross revenues above $200 million and a net profit greater than $100 million. 

Present-day visitors may hike to the abandoned Bonanza, Jumbo, and Erie mines, all of which are strenuous full-day hikes, with Erie Mine being a somewhat terrifying scramble along cliffs overlooking the Stairway Icefall.

Geology

Bonanza Peak is part of the Wrangellia Terrane. Copper deposits are found at the disconformity between the Upper Triassic Chitistone limestone and underlying Permian Nikolai greenstone. Copper is found as polymetallic replacement deposits in the fault planes, fractures and joints. Minerals include chalcocite, bornite and chalcopyrite, with associated malachite, azurite, and cuprite. Native copper can also be found in the greenstone. The deposits were mined for their spectacularly high-grade copper ore which exceeded 70 percent.

Climate

Based on the Köppen climate classification, Bonanza Peak is located in a subarctic climate zone with long, cold, snowy winters, and cool summers. Weather systems coming off the Gulf of Alaska are forced upwards by the Wrangell Mountains (orographic lift), causing heavy precipitation in the form of rainfall and snowfall. Temperatures can drop below −20 °C with wind chill factors below −30 °C. The months May through June offer the most favorable weather for viewing and climbing.

Gallery

See also

List of mountain peaks of Alaska
Geography of Alaska
Kennecott, Alaska

References

External links
 Weather forecast: Bonanza Peak
 Wiktionary: Bonanza definition

Landforms of Copper River Census Area, Alaska
Mines in Alaska
Mountains of Alaska
Wrangell–St. Elias National Park and Preserve
North American 2000 m summits